A driving range is a facility or area where golfers can practice their golf swing. It can also be a recreational activity itself for amateur golfers or when enough time for a full game is not available. Many golf courses have a driving range attached and they are also found as stand-alone facilities, especially in urban areas. They are typically run by businesses or sometimes by universities. Distances are usually marked by target greens at regular distances. Driving ranges may have natural grass, similar to a golf course, or players may use synthetic mats that resemble real turf. 

Golfers pay for various sizes of buckets of balls and hit at their leisure. Some ranges feature electronic tee devices, which load balls automatically, and record ball use on a smart card. Often there are golf professionals available to give lessons and instruction. Balls are retrieved by a specialty cart with a brush and roller attachment that automatically picks up balls and a cage that protects the driver from incoming balls. In urban and suburban areas, large nets protect surrounding people and structures from errant balls. Driving ranges are particularly popular in Japan where golf courses are overcrowded and often very expensive. Many commercial driving ranges are seen in conjunction with other sports-related practice areas such as batting cages or miniature golf. Some driving ranges also offer areas for practice chip shots, bunker shots, and putting.

Driving ranges may use golf balls that differ significantly from those used on the golf course. Range balls, as they are known, are often cheap and specially designed with a harder cover to make them more durable. As such they also may not necessarily conform to the rules of golf. In order to distinguish them from other type of ball, they may have a distinct coloring or colored band and be stamped with the word "range".

See also
Golf instruction
Indoor golf

References

Golf instruction